This is a list of beaches in Turkey.

Mediteran
 Patara Beach 
 Konyaaltı Beach
 İztuzu Beach
 Kaputaş Beach
 Kelebekler Vadisi
 Lara Beach, Antalya

Aegean Sea
 Ladies Beach, Kuşadası
 Altınkum Beach, Aydın

Black Sea
 Akçakoca Beach, Düzce
 Solar Beach, Kilyos, İstanbul
 Ayazma Beach, Şile, İstanbul
 Kumbaba Beach, Şile, İstanbul
 Uzunkum Beach, Şile, İstanbul
 Ağva Beach, Ağva, İstanbul
 Kilimli Beach: Kilimli, İstanbul
 Sahilköy Beach: Sahilköy, İstanbul
 Doğancılı Beach: Doğancalı, İstanbul
 Sofular Beach: Ağva, İstanbul
 Şile People's Beach: Şile, İstanbul
 Kumbaba – Ağlayankaya Beaches: Şile, İstanbul 
 Kabakoz Plajı: Ağva, İstanbul
 Akçakese Plajı: Ağva, İstanbul
 İmrenli Plajı: Ağva, İstanbul

Marmara Sea
 Kurşunlu Beach, Bursa

Unsorted

 Antalya
 Bodrum
 Çeşme
 Dalaman
 Didim
 Foça
 İztuzu Beach, Dalyan
 Kaputaş Beach, Kaş - Kalkan
 Kleopatra Beach, Alanya
 Ölüdeniz, Fethiye
 Patara Beach
 Urla

See also
 List of beaches

Turkey
Beaches
Atlantic Ocean-related lists
Beaches